Pinckneyville is an unincorporated community in Wilkinson County, Mississippi. Its elevation is 239 feet (73 m).

The town was named for the prominent Pinckney family of South Carolina, from which many of its settlers came. Charles Pinckney helped draft the US Constitution and served as governor of the state of South Carolina; other members of his family were also political leaders.

In 1815, the Pinckneyville Academy was established here.

Education
Wilkinson County School District serves the county.

References

Unincorporated communities in Wilkinson County, Mississippi
Unincorporated communities in Mississippi